Osias Godin (May 6, 1911 – April 20, 1988) was a Canadian politician, who represented the riding of Nickel Belt in the House of Commons of Canada from 1958 to 1965. He was a member of the Liberal Party of Canada.

Prior to his election to the House of Commons, Godin was a lawyer and city councillor in Sudbury.

References

External links
 

Members of the House of Commons of Canada from Ontario
Liberal Party of Canada MPs
1911 births
1988 deaths
Franco-Ontarian people
Sudbury, Ontario city councillors